Association of Wrongdoers is a 1987 French comedy film directed by Claude Zidi.

Plot
Gérard and Thierry  are business partners who are accused of stealing a safe from a wealthy tycoon in this situation comedy. A practical joke backfires when the two make their colleague Daniel believe he has won the lottery. The owner of the safe calls the police, who chase after the scheming duo. The two steal the safe a second time to cover the loss of the money taken in the first burglary. Monique is the sultry police commissioner and former flame of the robbery victim who investigates the bizarre case.

Cast
 François Cluzet as Thierry
 Christophe Malavoy as Gérard
 Véronique Genest as Monique Lemercier
 Jean-Claude Leguay as Daniel
 Jean-Pierre Bisson as Bernard Hassler
 Claire Nebout as Claire
 Gérard Lecaillon as Francis

Production
The film was shot between September 18 and October 31, 1986.

References

External links

1987 comedy films
1987 films
Films directed by Claude Zidi
French comedy films
1980s French-language films
1980s French films